The  is a Portuguese breed of livestock guardian dog. It is named for its area of origin, the Alentejo region of southern Portugal. It is recognised by the Clube Português de Canicultura, and was definitively accepted by the Fédération Cynologique Internationale in 1954.

History 

Dogs of this type were traditionally used to protect flocks during the biannual transhumance to summer pastures in the mountains, and then back to the plateau of the Alentejo for the winter. Since the late nineteenth century they have been known as Rafeiro do Alentejo. In 1954 the breed was accepted by the Fédération Cynologique Internationale in Group 2, Section 2.2: Mastiffs, Mountain Type, Portugal.

The Portuguese breed club is the Associação dos Criadores do Rafeiro do Alentejo. The breed is considered "vulnerable".

On 1 February 2023, a Rafeiro do Alentejo called Bobi was announced to have broken the Guinness World Record for the oldest living dog ever (at 30 years and 226 days).

Characteristics 

The Rafeiro is a large dog, slightly longer than it is tall, with a broad chest. The head is massive; the eyes are small and dark, the ears small, triangular and hanging. The coat is dense and straight, of short or medium length. It may be black, fawn, wolf grey or yellow, either brindled or not, but always with white markings; or may be white marked with these colours. It is not as thick as the coat of other pastoral dogs such as the Polish Tatra.

See also
 Dogs portal
 List of dog breeds

References

Further reading 

 
 Mitochondrial Diversity of Strains of Four Dog Breeds (in Portuguese); Biology Department, University of the Azores; retrieved 3 October 2008

FCI breeds
Dog breeds originating in Portugal
Livestock guardian dogs